The LIU Post Pioneers (also Long Island–Post Pioneers and formerly the C.W. Post Pioneers) were the athletic teams that represented the C.W. Post Campus of Long Island University, located in Brookville, New York, in NCAA Division II intercollegiate sports through the 2018–19 school year. The Pioneers most recently competed as members of the East Coast Conference for most sports; the football team was an affiliate of the Northeast-10 Conference. LIU Post had been a member of the ECC since 1989, when the league was established as the New York Collegiate Athletic Conference.

The LIU Post Pioneers passed into history after the 2018–19 school year when LIU merged the Pioneers with the LIU Brooklyn Blackbirds, the Division I program of the school's Brooklyn campus. The current LIU program now competes as the LIU Sharks, with the new nickname having been selected by polling of alumni and students of the two campuses. Since LIU Brooklyn was a long-established Division I program, the Division II LIU Post teams for sports that had not been sponsored by LIU Brooklyn immediately moved to Division I without the usual transition period for an institution moving to a different division. Teams for sports sponsored by both campuses were merged, and D-II athletes unable to make the D-I teams were allowed to either  continue their athletic scholarships without competing or to be granted waivers that allowed them to transfer to another D-II school without having to sit out a season. The LIU Sharks inherited the Northeast Conference membership of the Brooklyn campus.

Varsity teams

Men's sports (8)
Baseball
Basketball
Cross country
Football
Lacrosse
Soccer
Track and field
Wrestling

Women's sports (11)
Basketball
Cross country
Fencing
Equestrian
Golf
Lacrosse
Soccer
Softball
Swimming
Tennis
Track and field
Volleyball
Rugby

Facilities
The Pratt Center is also a venue for Nassau County and New York State high school basketball playoff games, both men's and women's, along with the Clark Center at the State University of New York College at Old Westbury.

History

Classifications
 1958–1972: NCAA College Division
 1973–1974, 1978–1985: NCAA Division II
 1975–1977, 1986–1992: NCAA Division III
 1993–2019: NCAA Division II
 2019–present: NCAA Division I (after merging with Division I LIU Brooklyn)

Football conferences
1957–1971: College Division Independent
1972–1976: Metropolitan Intercollegiate Conference
1977–1984: Division II Independent
1985–1992: Liberty Football Conference
1993–1996: Division II Independent
1997–2000: Eastern Football Conference
2001–2007: Northeast-10 Conference
2008–2012: Pennsylvania State Athletic Conference
2013–2018: Northeast-10 Conference
2019–present: Northeast Conference (after merging with Division I LIU Brooklyn)

National championships

Team

Individual sports

Baseball
In baseball, future Major League Baseball outfielder Richie Scheinblum batted .415 in 1964, and set the C.W. Post records in career triples (12) and batting average (.395).  He was inducted in the college's sports Hall of Fame in 2005.

Football

In 1993, future NFL quarterback Perry Klein played for the C. W. Post Pioneers, throwing for 38 touchdowns.  Klein was named the Division II Player of the Year, after throwing for an NCAA Division II record 614 yards passing (623 yards total yardage), 35 completions, and seven touchdowns in a single game, and a Division II record 3,757 regular season yards passing and 4,025 regular season yards in total offense, while also setting a school single-season records of most touchdowns.

Lacrosse
LIU Post won three NCAA Division II Men's Lacrosse Championships. Their first title came in 1996 when they defeated Adelphi 15–10 in the championship and their second came in 2009 when they defeated Le Moyne 8–7 at Gillette Stadium in Foxborough, Mass. The third title came in 2010 when they defeated Le Moyne 14–9 in a rematch of the 2009 title game at M&T Bank Stadium in Baltimore.

The LIU Post women's lacrosse team had a perfect, undefeated season and won the NCAA Division II Women's Lacrosse Championship in 2007.

Sports clubs
LIU Post is the only college campus on Long Island to maintain an Equestrian Center for horseback riding.

LIU Post has a nationally ranked ACHA ice hockey club team that competes in the Great Northeast Collegiate Hockey Conference.

References